The 2001 Thalgo Australian Women's Hardcourts was a women's tennis tournament played on outdoor hard courts at the Hope Island Resort Tennis Centre in Hope Island, Queensland, Australia and was part of the Tier III category of the 2001 WTA Tour. It was the fifth edition of the tournament and was held from 31 December 2000 through 6 January 2001. Eighth-seeded Justine Henin won the singles title and earned $27,000 first-prize money.

Finals

Singles

 Justine Henin defeated  Silvia Farina Elia 7–6(7–5), 6–4
 It was Henin's 1st title of the year and the 2nd of her career.

Doubles

 Giulia Casoni /  Janette Husárová defeated  Katie Schlukebir /  Meghann Shaughnessy 7–6(11–9), 7–5
 It was Casoni's only title of the year and the 2nd of her career. It was Husárová's 1st title of the year and the 6th of her career.

Entrants

Seeds

 Rankings are as of 25 December 2000.

Other entrants
The following players received wildcards into the singles main draw:
  Evie Dominikovic
  Christina Wheeler

The following players received entry from the qualifying draw:
  Wynne Prakusya
  Barbara Rittner
  Lina Krasnoroutskaya
  Gréta Arn

External links
 ITF tournament edition details
 Tournament draws

 
Thalgo Australian Women's Hardcourts
Brisbane International
Thal